The United States Women's National Ball Hockey Team is the women's national ball hockey team of United States, and a member of the International Street and Ball Hockey Federation (ISBHF).

History
At the 2017 ISBHF Worlds, the US earned their first-ever podium finish. In the semifinals, they defeated the two-time defending champion gold medalists Canada in a 3-2 tally. Becky Dobson would be credited with the game-winning goal.   Advancing to the gold medal game against host country Czech Republic, the US forced overtime, although the result was a 4-3 loss.   

Of note, the 2017 United States roster also featured three players from the NWHL. Among them were Cherie Stewart, who played in the inaugural season of the New York Riveters, Amber Moore, another Riveters alum, plus Paige Harrington, who captured the 2017 Isobel Cup championship as a member of the Buffalo Beauts.

World Championships

Awards and honors
 Becky Dobson, 2019 Ball Hockey World Championship All-Tournament Team Selection 
 Cherie Stewart, 2019 Ball Hockey World Championship All-Tournament Team Selection 
 Stephanie Caban, 2017 Ball Hockey World Championship All-Tournament Team Selection 
 Taylor Steadman, 2017 Ball Hockey World Championship All-Tournament Team Selection 
Megan Habina, Defense:, 2015 Ball Hockey World Championship  All-Star Team

References

External links 
http://www.usaballhockey.com

Ball hockey
Ball hockey